is a Japanese football player for AC Nagano Parceiro.

Career
Kazuki Yamaguchi signed for Shonan Bellmare in September 2017 to play for the Kanagawa-based club in 2018 season.

Club statistics
Updated to 18 February 2019.

References

External links

Profile at J. League
Profile at Shonan Bellmare

1995 births
Living people
Association football people from Aichi Prefecture
Japanese footballers
J1 League players
J2 League players
J3 League players
Shonan Bellmare players
FC Ryukyu players
AC Nagano Parceiro players
Association football forwards